Robert MacGregor was a British engineer, who, during the 1920s, concerned over unnecessary losses of North Sea colliers, developed the first steel hatch cover.

The design was simple and consisted of five articulated leaves that stowed neatly at the end of each hatch. Patented in 1929, the steel hatch improved ship and cargo safety and had a lasting impact on cargo care.

In 1937, to promote and sell his steel hatch covers, Robert MacGregor and his brother Joseph formed MacGregor & Company in Whitley Bay on the north-east coast of England.

References

External links
MacGREGOR Group website

British marine engineers
People from Whitley Bay
1873 births
1956 deaths
Engineers from Tyne and Wear